Caplen is an unincorporated community that is part of the Bolivar Peninsula census-designated place, in Galveston County, Texas, United States.

Government and infrastructure
On April 23, 1991, the community, and other areas of Galveston County, received an enhanced 9-1-1 system which routes calls to proper dispatchers and allows dispatchers to automatically view the address of the caller.

Education 
Caplen students are zoned to schools in the High Island Independent School District.

High Island ISD (and therefore Caplen) is assigned to Galveston College in Galveston.

Parks and recreation
The Galveston County Department of Parks and Senior Services operates the Lauderdale Boat Ramp in Caplen.

References

External links

Unincorporated communities in Galveston County, Texas
Greater Houston
Unincorporated communities in Texas